A folk taxonomy is a vernacular naming system, as distinct from scientific taxonomy. Folk biological classification is the way people traditionally describe and organize the world around them, typically making generous use of form taxa such as "shrubs", "bugs", "ducks", "fish", "algae", "vegetables", or of economic criteria such as "game animals", "pack animals", "weeds" and the like.

Folk taxonomies are generated from social knowledge and are used in everyday speech. They are distinguished from scientific taxonomies that claim to be disembedded from social relations and thus more objective and universal. Folk taxonomies exist to allow popular identification of classes of objects, and apply to all areas of human activity. All parts of the world have their own systems of naming local plants and animals. These naming systems are a vital aid to survival and include information such as the fruiting patterns of trees and the habits of large mammals. These localised naming systems are folk taxonomies. Theophrastus recorded evidence of a Greek folk taxonomy for plants, but later formalized botanical taxonomies were laid out in the 18th century by Carl Linnaeus.

Anthropologists have observed that taxonomies are generally embedded in local cultural and social systems, and serve various social functions. One of the best-known and most influential studies of folk taxonomies is Émile Durkheim's The Elementary Forms of Religious Life. Scientists generally recognize that folk taxonomies conflict at times with Linnaean taxonomy or current interpretations of evolutionary relationships, and can tend to refer to generalized rather than quantitatively informative traits in an organism. Some anthropologists say race is a folk taxonomy.

See also
 Glossary of scientific naming
 Parataxonomy
 Baraminology, a taxonomy used in creation science
 Cladistics
 Common name
 Contrast set
 Corporate taxonomy
 Ethnotaxonomy
 Evolutionary taxonomy
 Incertae sedis
 Linnaean taxonomy
 Phylogenetics
 Wastebasket taxon

References

Bibliography
Bailenson, J.N., M.S. Shum, S. Atran, D.L. Medin, & J.D. Coley (2002) "A bird's eye view: biological categorization and reasoning within and across cultures". Cognition 84:1–53
Berlin, Brent (1972) "Speculations on the growth of ethnobotanical nomenclature", Language in Society, 1, 51–86.
Berlin, Brent & Dennis E. Breedlove & Peter H. Raven (1966) "Folk taxonomies and biological classification", Science, 154, 273–275.
Berlin, Brent & Dennis E. Breedlove & Peter H. Raven (1973) "General principles of classification and nomenclature in folk biology", American Anthropologist, 75, 214–242.
Brown, Cecil H. (1974) "Unique beginners and covert categories in folk biological taxonomies", American Anthropologist, 76, 325–327.
Brown, Cecil H. & John Kolar & Barbara J. Torrey & Tipawan Truoong-Quang & Phillip Volkman. (1976) "Some general principles of biological and non-biological folk classification", American Ethnologist, 3, 1, 73–85.
Brown, Cecil H. (1986) "The growth of ethnobiological nomenclature", Current Anthropology, 27, 1, 1–19.

Taxonomy
Scientific folklore